Vianney Vivien Mabidé (born 31 August 1988) is a Central African footballer who plays for Moroccan club Kawkab Marrakech. He was called up to Central African football team, competing at the 2012 Africa Cup of Nations qualification, where he scored one goal.

Club career

Raja Casablanca
Mabidé signed a three-year contract with Raja Casablanca on 11 July 2012 for 2.5million dirham. During the 2013 FIFA Club World Cup Semi-finals match against Atlético Mineiro, he scored the third goal in a 3–1 victory that saw Raja progress to the Final against Bayern Munich.

Before the semifinal of 2013 FIFA Club World Cup, when Raja would face Brazilian side Atlético Mineiro, Mabidé spoke about Ronaldinho and caused a huge controversy. According to him: "I already faced Messi, how can I fear Ronaldinho? He is no more the same Ronaldinho from Barcelona times." Ironically, he scored, in the victory of 3–1 over Brazilians, the last goal of the game, what permitted Raja in the final. After the game, reducing the controversy, Mabidé spoke these words: "He (Ronaldinho) is no more the same player from Barcelona times. But he is still a great player."

Career statistics

Club

International goals
 Scores and results list Central African Republic's goal tally first

Honours
Raja Casablanca
Botola (1): 2012-13

Notes

References

External links 
 
 
 
 Vianney Mabidé at Footballdatabase

1988 births
People from Bangui
Living people
Association football midfielders
Central African Republic footballers
Central African Republic international footballers
Raja CA players
Moghreb Tétouan players
Al-Taawoun FC players
Kawkab Marrakech players
Saudi Professional League players
Botola players
Central African Republic expatriate footballers
Central African Republic expatriate sportspeople in Gabon
Expatriate footballers in Gabon
Central African Republic expatriate sportspeople in Morocco
Expatriate footballers in Morocco
Central African Republic expatriate sportspeople in Saudi Arabia
Expatriate footballers in Saudi Arabia
Central African Republic expatriate sportspeople in Libya
Expatriate footballers in Libya